Fulton Street Farmers Market is a farmers market that opened in 1922 in the Grand Rapids, Michigan area.

History 

During the 1800s, farmers would gather in the downtown streets to sell their wares, but by the turn of the century, it was illegal to sell along the streets, and farmers were told to go to a large market on an island in the river if they wanted to sell. By 1914, local women who were a part of the Grand Rapids Federation of Women's Clubs lobbied for the city to set up a dedicated space for the farmers to come and sell. The new farmer's market opened on Leonard Street and became very popular. Other markets opened in the city and were just as popular as the original. 

The market on Fulton Street started in 1922, around the same time as many other markets in Michigan. It still operates in its original location and configuration. For a long time, the market was organized under the Public Services Department of Grand Rapids. Eventually, the City Parks and Recreation Department took over leadership and organization and the market became a city park. 

The market underwent a $3 million renovation in 2012 and 2013. A roof was added in 2012, along with a refurbished outdoor market space, as well as permanent stalls with electricity and lighting.  In addition, a year-round vendor building was opened in May 2013. The 2,000-square-foot space includes vendor space, restrooms, the market office, and an information desk.

Values and Mission 
The Fulton Street Market seeks to steward a marketplace that uplifts farmers, producers, and the wider community. It desires to be an equitable and resilient food system in Michigan. It is committed to the local community and making it a better place, with greater access to food, and a focus on sustainability, health, representation, and education.

Payment Options

All eligible vendors at the market accept SNAP, Double Up Food Bucks, and WIC (including Project Fresh). The market was one of the largest included in a pilot program for mobile digital payments.

References

External links
Fulton Street Farmers Market website
Fulton Street Artisans Market website

Farmers' markets in the United States
Buildings and structures in Grand Rapids, Michigan